Lester Spell (born December 24, 1942) is an American politician who served as the Mississippi Commissioner of Agriculture and Commerce from 1996 to 2012.

References

1942 births
Living people
Mississippi Commissioners of Agriculture and Commerce
Mississippi Democrats
Mississippi Republicans